Playboy Enterprises, Inc. v. Welles, 279 F.3d 796 (9th Cir., 2002), was a court ruling at the United States Court of Appeals for the Ninth Circuit. The ruling was an important early precedent on the nominative use of trademarked terms for self-identification on the World Wide Web.

Facts
Terri Welles has modeled for Playboy magazine and was named Playboy Playmate of the Year ("PMOY") in 1981. In the mid-1990s Welles established a personal and promotional website in which she described herself as a former Playboy model and Playmate of the Year, frequently using the magazine's name plus the acronym "PMOY". Welles also used those terms in the site's metatags for searching purposes, and in banner ads that advertised the availability of her site elsewhere.

Playboy Enterprises, Inc. filed suit against Welles, claiming trademark infringement and trademark dilution. Welles responded that she could not legitimately describe herself without using the magazine's trademarked terms, and in doing so she was engaged in nominative use (a component of the fair use defense in trademark law) of the trademarks rather than infringement of them.

The case was first heard at the District Court for the Southern District of California, which ruled in favor of Playboy Enterprises and enjoined Welles from using the trademarked terms at her website. Welles appealed to the Ninth Circuit.

Circuit court opinion
The circuit court overturned most of the district court's ruling, and found that Welles had not infringed on the Playboy trademarks and could claim the nominative use defense. According to American trademark law, nominative use of a different party's trademarks is permitted when:
The product or service can not be readily identified without using the trademark (i.e. trademark is descriptive of a person, place, or product attribute);
Only so much of the mark may be used as is reasonably necessary for identification (e.g. the words may be reasonably used but not the specific font or logo); and
The user does nothing to suggest sponsorship or endorsement by the trademark holder, which applies even if the nominative use is commercial.

Playboy Enterprises claimed that Welles's use of its trademarks was an infringement because her actions were likely to cause confusion among web users who could conclude that her site was the official Playboy site. Here the company claimed that Welles's site caused initial interest confusion, in the belief that web users interested in purchasing Playboy merchandise would be confused and think that Welles's site was the forum at which to do it. That legal doctrine had been defined by the Ninth Circuit precedent Brookfield Communications, Inc. v. West Coast Entertainment Corp. in 1999.  

The district court found that Playboy Enterprises failed to present any evidence that Welles's use of the trademarked terms at her website damaged its merchandise sales, that her usage was likely to lead users to believe that her site was affiliated with the magazine, or that an appreciable number of web users would land on Welles' site upon searching for the Playboy site. Therefore, the company's trademarks were not diluted by Welles's use of them on her own site. 

Furthermore, the court held that Welles was entitled to mention the name of the magazine and its related terms like "PMOY" in a basic description of herself for identification and promotion purposes. This in turn was an allowable nominative use of the trademarks. The truly new issue to be decided in this case was the matter of trademark usage in the metatags for a website created by a different party. Here the circuit court ruled that Welles's use of the trademarked terms for this purpose was nominative as well. However, she was not permitted to use the distinctive Playboy rabbit logo at her site.

Impact
Playboy Enterprises, Inc. v. Welles has been noted as an important early Internet law precedent, clarifying the use of trademarks at sites designed by, and promoting, parties other than the owner of those trademarks. The ruling was especially influential in addressing this matter in the use of metatags, which can affect the results when a web user searches for an official site but finds an unaffiliated site in which the owner is only mentioned for descriptive purposes.

References

External links
Text of the Playboy Enterprises Inc. v. Welles opinion
Text of the Brookfield Communications, Inc. v. West Coast Entertainment Corp. opinion

United States Court of Appeals for the Ninth Circuit cases
United States trademark case law
2002 in United States case law
Fair use case law
Playboy litigation